The 1979 Kansas City Royals season was their 11th season in Major League Baseball. The Royals finished second in the American League West at 85-77, three games behind the California Angels and ending Kansas City's run of three consecutive division titles. Darrell Porter tied a single-season franchise record with 112 runs batted in. George Brett led the American League in hits (212) and triples (20). Manager Whitey Herzog was fired following the season.

Offseason 
 January 9, 1979: Mike Bielecki was drafted by the Royals in the 6th round of the 1979 Major League Baseball draft, but did not sign.
 February 26, 1979: Eduardo Rodríguez was purchased by the Royals from the Milwaukee Brewers.

Regular season

Season standings

Record vs. opponents

Notable transactions 
 April 3, 1979: Doug Bird was traded by the Royals to the Philadelphia Phillies for Todd Cruz.
 April 27, 1979: George Throop was traded by the Royals to the Houston Astros for a player to be named later. The Astros completed the deal by sending Keith Drumright to the Royals on October 26.
 June 5, 1979: 1979 Major League Baseball draft
Atlee Hammaker was drafted by the Royals in the 1st round (21st pick).
Dan Marino was drafted by the Royals in the 4th round (99th pick overall).
John Elway was drafted by the Royals in the 18th round (463rd pick overall).

Roster

Player stats

Batting

Starters by position 
Note: Pos = Position; G = Games played; AB = At bats; H = Hits; Avg. = Batting average; HR = Home runs; RBI = Runs batted in

Other batters 
Note: G = Games played; AB = At bats; H = Hits; Avg. = Batting average; HR = Home runs; RBI = Runs batted in

Pitching

Starting pitchers 
Note: G = Games pitched; IP = Innings pitched; W = Wins; L = Losses; ERA = Earned run average; SO = Strikeouts

Other pitchers 
Note: G = Games pitched; IP = Innings pitched; W = Wins; L = Losses; ERA = Earned run average; SO = Strikeouts

Relief pitchers 
Note: G = Games pitched; W = Wins; L = Losses; SV = Saves; ERA = Earned run average; SO = Strikeouts

Farm system

Notes

References 

1979 Kansas City Royals at Baseball Reference
1979 Kansas City Royals at Baseball Almanac

Kansas City Royals seasons
Kansas City Royals season
Kansas City